Leska may refer to:

 Leskë, a village in Albania
 Leska, Kyustendil Province, a village in Bulgaria
 Leska, Croatia, a village near Delnice